HHHR Tower, also known as the Blue Tower, is a supertall skyscraper on Sheikh Zayed Road, Dubai, United Arab Emirates. The construction of the 72-floor,  building started in 2006 and was completed in 2010. Designed by architect Al Hashemi, the building is primarily residential, with some commercial uses. 

As of 2022, HHHR Tower is the 16th-tallest residential building in the world and the sixth-tallest residential building in Dubai. The tower comprises 454 residential apartments.

The building was built by a joint venture between Al Ahmadiah Contracting and Trading Co., from the UAE and Hip Hing Construction Co. Ltd. from Hong Kong. Another hallmark project by this team is the Masdar City in Abu Dhabi.

Construction Gallery

See also
 List of tallest buildings in Dubai
 List of tallest buildings in the United Arab Emirates
 List of tallest residential buildings
 Al Yaqoub Tower
 Gevora Hotel

References

External links 

 
 
 Al Ahmadiah Contracting & Trading
 Hip Hing Construction

Residential skyscrapers in Dubai
Residential buildings completed in 2009
Futurist architecture
Architecture in Dubai
High-tech architecture
2009 establishments in the United Arab Emirates